Unstable is an upcoming American comedy series made by the streaming service Netflix starring Rob Lowe and his son John Owen Lowe, with both also acting as executive producers on the series, along with Victor Fresco. The series is set to debut on Netflix on March 30, 2023.

Synopsis
A father-son comedy in which socially shy son (John Owen Lowe) begins working for his successful and admired, but eccentric and narcissistic-adjacent, father (Rob Lowe) at his high-tech bio research facility in order to help save him from spiralling further following the death of his wife.

Cast
 Rob Lowe as Ellis Dragon
 John Owen Lowe as Jackson Dragon 
 Sian Clifford as Anna Bennet 
 Aaron Branch as Malcolm
 Rachel Marsh as Luna Castillo 
 Emma Ferreira as Ruby 
 Fred Armisen as Leslie
 Tom Allen as JT
 J.T. Parr as Chas
 Frank Gallegos as Juan
 Brie Elay as Melissa

Episodes

Production
The show was picked up straight-to-series by Netflix and the formation of the show was reportedly inspired by John Owen Lowe’s social media trolling of his father Rob Lowe. John Owen Lowe described the series as “about a father-son dynamic that’s very relatable but under a really specific lens, which is a father who loves being the center of attention and his son, who feels the exact opposite.” 

It was announced in April 2022 that Rob Lowe and his son John Owen Lowe would both act as executive producers on the show along with Victor Fresco, with production being handled by the Netflix studio. In June 2022 the series added Sian Clifford to the cast alongside Rachel Marsh, Emma Ferreira and Aaron Branch in series regular roles. Additionally, Fred Armisen, Tom Allen and JT Parr were announced in guest roles.

Release
The eight half-hour episodes of Unstable are scheduled to be released on March 30, 2023.

References

External links

2020s American comedy television series
2023 American television series debuts
English-language Netflix original programming
Television series about families
Upcoming comedy television series
Upcoming Netflix original programming